Lady Mary Tudor, Countess of Derwentwater (16 October 1673 – 5 November 1726) was an actress and natural daughter of King Charles II of England by his mistress, Mary "Moll" Davies, an actress and singer.

Biography

Early life and title 
Mary grew up in a house on the south-west side of St James Square, close to St James's Park and Whitehall palace, and from an early age she was surrounded by the high society of The Restoration. Mary followed in her mother's footsteps, and began acting at a young age. She was a part of the many performances put on at Charles II's elaborate court. At age nine, she sang the part of the Roman god of desire, erotic love, attraction and affection, Cupid, alongside her mother, who was starring as Venus, in the play Venus and Adonis.

On 10 December 1680, seven-year-old Mary was, in recognition of her paternity, granted by a Royal warrant, the name Tudor (as a nod to their collateral descent from the Tudor family) and the precedence of the daughter of an Earl. In September 1683, she was issued an annuity of £1500 (roughly ), and a year later, on 21 February 1684, her precedence was heightened to that of a daughter of a Duke.

Marriages and children 
On 18 August 1687, Lady Mary married Edward Radclyffe, 2nd Earl of Derwentwater (9 December 1655 – 29 April 1705) by whom she had four children:

 James Radclyffe, 3rd Earl of Derwentwater (1689–1716)
 Lady Mary Tudor Radclyffe
 Charles Radclyffe (3 September 1693 – 8 December 1746)
 Hon. Francis Radclyffe

Mary separated from Lord Derwentwater in 1700, reportedly due to her unwillingness to convert to Roman Catholicism.

On 23 May 1705, shortly after Lord Derwentwater's death, she married secondly, to Henry Graham. Graham died on 7 January 1707. A few months later, on 26 August, Lady Mary married Major James Rooke. By whom she had one daughter
 Margaret Frances Disney Rooke (ca. 1708-1720 1766) married a William Sheldon and had issue.

Death 
Lady Mary died in Paris on 5 November 1726, aged 53.

References 

1673 births
1726 deaths
17th-century English people
18th-century English actresses
17th-century Scottish people
18th-century Scottish actresses
17th-century English women
18th-century English women
18th-century English people
Mary
Illegitimate children of Charles II of England
British emigrants to France
Derwentwater
Daughters of kings